Ursula Eriksson and Sabina Eriksson (born 3 November 1967) are Swedish twin sisters who came to national attention in the United Kingdom in May 2008. The twins had been in Ireland before travelling to the UK and boarding a bus for London in Liverpool. Their odd behavior after exiting the bus at a service station on the M6 motorway caused the driver not to allow them back on board. The two were later seen on the central reservation of the M6 motorway. When Highways England traffic officers arrived to assist the women, they ran across the busy motorway, as captured by a small television crew. Ursula managed to dodge traffic, but Sabina was knocked over. Shortly after police arrived, the women again dashed onto the motorway and were struck by oncoming vehicles. Ursula suffered serious injuries, and when Sabina regained consciousness, she refused medical aid and attacked a police officer, at which point she was arrested and sedated.

Appearing calm, though behaving unusually, Sabina was processed by police in Stoke-on-Trent and was later released from custody. Shortly afterwards, she was seen and taken in by Glenn Hollinshead, of Fenton, Staffordshire, whom she suddenly stabbed to death the next day. Sabina was then pursued running from the scene and arrested in hospital after jumping from a bridge onto a busy trunk road. Despite these incidents, there was no evidence that drugs or alcohol were involved in the incidents on the M6 or the killing of Hollinshead. Sabina later pleaded guilty to manslaughter with diminished responsibility, after an apparent episode of folie à deux (or "shared psychosis"), a rare psychiatric disorder in which delusional beliefs are transmitted from one individual to another. Ursula was released from the hospital after recovering and now lives in Bellevue, Washington, but Sabina was sentenced to five years imprisonment and released on parole in 2011 before returning to Sweden.

Background

Sabina Eriksson and her identical twin sister, Ursula Eriksson, were born in Sweden on 3 November 1967, and grew up in Sunne, Värmland, with an older sister named Mona and an older brother named Björn. In their youth there was no apparent history of mental health issues or criminal convictions, and by 2000, Ursula was living in the United States while Sabina was living in Mallow, County Cork, Ireland with her spouse and two children.

Ursula visited Sabina on Friday 16 May 2008, but for reasons that were unclear, the sisters secretly departed Sabina's home for Liverpool, England. Probably travelling by ferry, they arrived in Liverpool at 8:30am on Saturday, and went to St Anne Street Police Station, apparently in order to report concerns over the safety of Sabina's children. Liverpool Police contacted Dublin to follow up the request, learning that Sabina had had a fight with her partner the previous night. At around 11:30am that morning, the pair then boarded a National Express coach headed to London.

Incidents

Bus journey
A police report stated that the twins suddenly disembarked from the bus at Keele services, a motorway service station, as they were not feeling well. The driver of the bus, however, said he left them at Keele services, even though it was not a scheduled rest stop, at around 1:00pm after becoming suspicious of their erratic behavior. He noticed the twins clinging to their bags tightly and did not let them re-board because they refused to let him search their bags for illegal items. The manager of the service station was informed and, also feeling suspicious of the pair's demeanor, movements, and fixation on their bags, she called the police. Officers arrived to talk to them but left after saying that the women seemed harmless.

Running onto the motorway
As seen on closed-circuit television cameras, the pair departed the services on foot and began to walk down the central reservation of the M6 before attempting to cross it, causing chaos to the traffic and picking up minor injuries in the attempt – Sabina having been struck by a SEAT León. Their elder brother claimed in a Swedish newspaper that his sisters were fleeing from maniacs who were chasing them, although there is nothing to support this. Highways Agency officers responded to the incident, and police from the Central Motorway Police Group were called to assist. The police were accompanied by a small television crew who happened to be filming Motorway Cops with the officers. Standing on the north direction hard shoulder of the motorway, the police were being apprised of the situation when, without warning, Ursula broke free and ran into the side of an oncoming Mercedes-Benz Actros 2546 articulated lorry travelling at around 56 mph (90 km/h). Sabina then quickly followed her into the road and was hit head-on by a Volkswagen Polo travelling at high speed.

Both survived. Ursula was immobilised as the lorry had crushed her legs, and Sabina spent fifteen minutes unconscious. The pair were treated by paramedics; however, Ursula resisted medical aid by spitting, scratching, and screaming. Ursula told the policemen restraining her, "I recognise you – I know you're not real", and Sabina, now conscious, shouted "They're going to steal your organs". To the surprise of the police, Sabina got to her feet, despite attempts from police officers Tracy Cope and Paul Finlayson to persuade her to stay on the ground. Sabina started screaming for help and calling for the police even though they were present, then hit officer Cope in the face, before running into traffic on the other side of the motorway. Emergency workers and several members of the public caught up with her, restrained, and carried her to a waiting ambulance, at which point she was handcuffed and sedated. Given the similarities in their behaviors, a suicide pact or drug use was quickly suspected.

Ursula was taken to hospital by air ambulance. Sabina was taken to hospital where, despite her ordeal and an apparent lack of concern over her sister's injuries, she soon became calmer and controlled, and was released five hours later. In police custody she remained relaxed, and while being processed, she told an officer, "We say in Sweden that an accident rarely comes alone. Usually at least one more follows – maybe two." On 19 May 2008, Sabina was released from court without a full psychiatric evaluation having pleaded guilty to the charges of trespass on the motorway and hitting a police officer. The court sentenced her to one day in custody which she had been deemed to have served having spent a full night in police custody.

The killing of Glenn Hollinshead
Leaving court, Sabina began to wander the streets of Stoke-on-Trent, trying to locate her sister in hospital, and carrying her possessions in a clear plastic bag given to her by police. She was also wearing her sister's green top. At 7:00 pm, two local men spotted Sabina while walking their dog on Christchurch Street, Fenton. One of the men was 54-year-old Glenn Hollinshead, a self-employed welder, qualified paramedic, and former RAF airman, and the other was his friend, Peter Molloy. Sabina appeared friendly and stroked the dog as the three struck up a conversation. Although friendly, Sabina appeared to be behaving nervously, which worried Molloy. Sabina asked the two men for directions to any nearby bed and breakfasts or hotels.

Hollinshead took pity on her and instead offered to take her back to his house at nearby Duke Street. Sabina accepted and relaxed as she began to relate how she was trying to locate her hospitalised sister. Back at the house, over drinks, her odd behavior continued as she constantly got up and looked out of the window, leading Molloy to assume that she had run away from an abusive partner. She appeared paranoid too, offering the men cigarettes, only to quickly snatch them out of their mouths, claiming they may be poisoned. Shortly before midnight, Molloy left and Sabina stayed the night.

The next day around midday, Hollinshead called his brother regarding local hospitals in order to locate Sabina's sister Ursula. At 7:40pm, while a meal was being prepared, Hollinshead left the house to ask a neighbor, Frank Booth, for tea bags and then went back inside. One minute later he staggered back outside, now bleeding, and told him "She stabbed me", before collapsing to the ground and quickly dying from his injuries. His last words before he died, allegedly, were, "Look after my dog for me."

As Booth dialled 999, Sabina fled the premises, and was caught on the run by nearby CCTV. She ran out of the house with a hammer, periodically hitting herself over the head with it. A passing motorist, Joshua Grattage, saw this and decided to tackle her in an attempt to take control of the hammer. While wrestling with him, Sabina screamed and took a roof tile out of her pocket and struck him on the back of the head with it, stunning him temporarily. By this time paramedics had found her and gave chase. The pursuit ended at Heron Cross when Sabina jumped from a 12-metre (40 ft) high bridge onto the A50. Breaking both ankles and fracturing her skull in the fall, she was taken to hospital.

Trial
On 6 June 2008 Sabina was arrested while recovering at University Hospital of North Staffordshire, and was discharged in a wheelchair on 11 September 2008, at which point she was taken into custody and charged with murder the same day. Ursula was also released from hospital in September, and relocated uneventfully back to Sweden, and then the US. The trial was scheduled for February 2009, but was adjourned after the court encountered difficulties in obtaining her medical records from Sweden. The trial was then scheduled to start on 1 September 2009.

Sabina pleaded guilty to manslaughter with diminished responsibility on 2 September 2009, having stabbed her victim five times with a kitchen knife. At no point during her interrogation or during the trial did she explain her actions, only replying "no comment" to extensive police questioning. Similarly, at no time was the video from the M6 used in evidence in the court. Both the prosecution and defence claimed that Sabina was insane at the time of the killing, although she had become sane again by the time of her trial. The defence counsel in the trial claimed that Eriksson was a "secondary" sufferer of folie à deux, influenced by the presence or perceived presence of her twin sister, the "primary" sufferer. The court also heard that she had suffered from a rare psychiatric disorder which made her hear voices, but could not interpret what they said, as well as an alternative theory that she had suffered from acute polymorphic delusional disorder. Her plea was accepted by the prosecution at Nottingham Crown Court on 2 September 2010. Justice Saunders concluded that Sabina had a "low" level of culpability for her actions:Sabina was sentenced to five years in prison and was sent to Bronzefield Women's Prison, where she turned to Christianity. Having already spent 439 days in custody before sentencing, this left her first eligible for release in 2011.

Aftermath
Many questions were left unanswered. Some called for an investigation into the way the criminal justice system handled the matter, including Peter Molloy and MP for Stoke South Rob Flello. Glenn Hollinshead's brother Garry was critical of the justice system which he viewed as enabling the murder, stating:

In 2012 a section that had been edited out of the Motorway Cops episode was uploaded to YouTube. It shows police officers at the roadside, after Ursula had been run over, discussing detaining and assessing Sabina on mental health grounds - which may have prevented Hollinshead's murder - but this was not done.

Media
 2010 – Madness in the Fast Lane is a BBC documentary, first broadcast on BBC One on 10 August. The footage on the M6 motorway of the two women jumping into the passing traffic had previously been broadcast on Motorway Cops, but this was the first time the rest of the story had been told.
 2012 – A Madness Shared By Two , David Cann 
 2016 – "Case 17 - The Eriksson Twins." Casefile True Crime Podcast
 2017 - "58 - Some Quiet Sunday," My Favorite Murder podcast
 2019 - "The Eriksson Twins," Mr. Bunker's Conspiracy Time Podcast
 2019 - "Episode 46 - Two Tales of Twisted Sisters," Creep Street podcast
 2019 - "Episode 22 - The Eriksson Twins" Cult Liter podcast
 2020 - "Episode 13: Tangents & True Crime - The Eriksson Twins", Ladies & Tangents Apple Podcast
 2020 - "Episode 433: The Murderous Madness of the Twins Eriksson", The Last Podcast on the Left
 2021 - "Season 5, Episode 43" - They Walk Among us Podcast
2021 - "Episode 94" - Scared to Death Podcast
2021 - Season 5, Episode 20 - "The Madness of Twins", Seeing Red Podcast
2021 - "Season 2, Episode 11 - The Story of the Eriksson Twins", Truth Be Told Podcast
2021 - Episode 108 - "Venom, Theatres, Parsi Food, Shared Psychosis", The Internet Said So

See also
 Bouffée délirante
 Folie à deux

References

External links
Madness in the Fast Lane, official BBC page
Casefile True Crime Podcast - Case 17: The Eriksson Twins - 30 April 2016
Women dice with death on M6, BBC News, 25 September 2008

1967 births
Identical twins
Living people
Prisoners and detainees of England and Wales
Swedish expatriates in the United Kingdom
Swedish female criminals
Swedish people convicted of manslaughter
Swedish people imprisoned abroad
Swedish twins
2008 murders in the United Kingdom
Sibling duos